Spring in Immenhof is a 1974 West German family film directed by Wolfgang Schleif and starring Heidi Brühl, Horst Janson and Olga Tschechowa. It is the fifth and last of the series of Immenhof films, part of the heimatfilm tradition. It marked the final film appearance of the veteran actress Olga Tschechowa.

Cast
 Heidi Brühl as Brigitte 'Dalli' Voss
 Horst Janson as Alexander Arkens
 Birgit Westhausen as Billy
 Bettina Westhausen as Bobby
 Olga Tschechowa as Großmutter
 Giulia Follina as Sigrid
 Katharina Brauren as Mutter Carsten
 Vera Gruber as Stine
 Henry Vahl as Wedderkopp-Vater
 Franz Schafheitlin as Dr. Tiedemann
 Günter Lüdke as Ole
 Wolfram Schaerf as Henning Holm
 Alexander Grill as Döberlein
 Thomas Balzer as Hasso
 Esther Rudat as Eva
 Martina Glietz as Suse
 Sönke Rowedder as Zeck

References

Bibliography 
 Hans-Michael Bock and Tim Bergfelder. The Concise Cinegraph: An Encyclopedia of German Cinema. Berghahn Books, 2009.

External links 
 

1974 films
1974 drama films
German drama films
West German films
1970s German-language films
Films directed by Wolfgang Schleif
Films about horses
Constantin Film films
1970s German films